Gabriel d'Aubarède (28 September 1898 – 31 December 1995) was a French novelist, literary critic and journalist. His 1959 novel La Foi de notre enfance won the Grand Prix du roman de l'Académie française.

Work 
1943: Honnorin ou le mauvais esprit, éditions Gallimard
1946: La Révolution des saints, Gallimard
1948: L'oncle Fred n'est plus jeune, Gallimard
1959: La Foi de notre enfance, éditions Flammarion, Grand prix du roman de l'Académie française
2004: De mémoire d'oublié (illustrations by Roger Wild), éditions La Table Ronde

References 

1898 births
1995 deaths
Writers from Marseille
20th-century French novelists
20th-century French male writers
French literary critics
20th-century French journalists
Grand Prix du roman de l'Académie française winners
French male non-fiction writers